The 1925 All-Ireland Junior Hurling Championship was the eighth staging of the All-Ireland Junior Championship since its establishment by the Gaelic Athletic Association in 1912.

Tipperary entered the championship as the defending champions, however, they were beaten by Cork in the Munster semi-final.

The All-Ireland final was played on 4 July 1926 at the Thurles Sportsfield, between Cork and Dublin, in what was their first ever meeting in the final. Cork won the match by 5–06 to 1–00 to claim their third championship title overall and a first title since 1916.

Results

All-Ireland Junior Hurling Championship

All-Ireland semi-final

All-Ireland final

References

Junior
All-Ireland Junior Hurling Championship